Shopping TVA is associated with the following articles:

 Shopping TVA (TV channel) - a former Canadian French language television shopping channel.
 Shopping TVA (TV program) - a former Canadian French language television shopping show.